The Fairleigh Dickinson Knights women's basketball team represents Fairleigh Dickinson University in women's college basketball. Their colors are burgundy, white, and blue. This mid-major team competes in the Northeast Conference. The Knights host opponents in the Rothman Center, which can seat up to 6,000, in Hackensack, New Jersey.

History
The Fairleigh Dickinson Knights women's basketball team joined the Northeast Conference of Division I, in their 1988–89 season. 
Since 1988, the Fairleigh Dickinson Knights have won two Northeast Conference Tournament titles, as well as regular season title. The Knights have had four different coaches during their Northeast Conference era, including Sharon Beverly, Sandy Gordon, Peter Cinella and current coach Angelika Szumilo

Yearly records
Sources:

 Northeast Conference 2015–16 Standings
 Northeast Conference 2016–17 Standings
 2017-18 NEC Women's Basketball Standings

Record Against NEC Opponents

Record Against Other Conferences

References

External links